Finley Point State Park is a  public recreation area located on the Finley Point peninsula at the southern end of Flathead Lake ten miles east of the community of Big Arm. The state park has RV and tent camping facilities as well as boat camping slips.

References

External links
Finley Point State Park Montana Fish, Wildlife & Parks

State parks of Montana
Protected areas of Flathead County, Montana
Protected areas established in 1965
1965 establishments in Montana